Gymnophthalmus pleii, known commonly as the Martinique spectacled tegu and the rough-scaled worm lizard, is a species of lizard in the family Gymnophthalmidae, a family known commonly as "microteiids". The species is found in the Caribbean, on the Lesser Antilles islands of Guadeloupe, Dominica, Martinique, Saint Lucia, and Maria I.

Taxonomy and geographic range
The nominate subspecies, G. p. pleii, is endemic to Martinique, and G. p. luetkeni and G. p. nesydrion are restricted to Saint Lucia.  The populations on Guadeloupe and Dominica have not yet been assigned to subspecies.

Etymology
The specific name pleii, is in honor of French botanist Auguste Plée.

References

Further reading

Boulenger, George Albert (1885). Catalogue of the Lizards in the British Museum (Natural History). Second Edition. Volume II. ... Teiidæ ... London: Trustees of the British Museum (Natural History). (Taylor and Francis, printers). xiii + 497 pp. + Plates I-XXIV. (Gymnophthalmus pleii, p. 429).

Schwartz, Albert; Thomas, Richard (1975). A Check-list of West Indian Amphibians and Reptiles. Carnegie Museum of Natural History Special Publication No. 1. Pittsburgh: Trustees of Carnegie Institute. 216 pp. ("Gymnophthalmus pleei [sic]", p. 123).

External links
 

Gymnophthalmus
Reptiles of Dominica
Fauna of Martinique
Reptiles of Saint Lucia
Reptiles of Guadeloupe
Lizards of the Caribbean
Reptiles described in 1881
Taxa named by Marie Firmin Bocourt